Abbey House Museum in Kirkstall, Leeds, West Yorkshire, England is housed in the gatehouse of the ruined 12th-century Kirkstall Abbey, and is a Grade II* listed building. It is part of the Leeds Museums & Galleries group.

History 
The museum opened in July 1927. The ground floor is set out as an area of Victorian streets, illustrating a range of shops and services and including original shop fittings etc. The first street, Abbey Fold, opened in July 1954.  Harewood Square opened in 1955 and Stephen Harding Gate in 1958. The museum was refurbished between 1998 and 2001 funded by National Lottery Heritage Fund.

Upstairs, the galleries feature childhood collections, community-curated displays and temporary exhibitions.

The paranormal TV programme Most Haunted visited the Abbey House Museum in the first episode of Series 19. The crew experienced apparent paranormal incidents which included knocking and a piano playing by itself.

See also 
 Grade II* listed buildings in Leeds
 Listed buildings in Leeds (Kirkstall Ward)
 Violet Crowther
 Emily Wardman

References

External links 

 
 BBC: Abbey House Museum tour
  
 Abbey House Museum on Leeds daily photo
Leeds Museums & Galleries: Three Women: a plesiosaurus, a mistaken identity, and a hat.

Museums in Leeds
Listed buildings in Leeds
Grade II* listed buildings in West Yorkshire
History museums in West Yorkshire